Syracuse War Cemetery is a Commonwealth War Graves Commission burial ground for the dead of World War II located near Syracuse on the island of Sicily.

Foundation

The site of the cemetery was selected in 1943 at an early stage in the operations for the capture of Sicily. In this cemetery most of the graves are those of men who lost their lives in the landings in Sicily on 10 July 1943, as part of the early stages of the campaign to capture the island (Operation Husky).

They include those of a considerable number who belonged to the airborne force that was landed immediately west of the town during the night 9–10 July. Graves were brought into Syracuse War Cemetery from as far north as Lentini. There is one grave for a casualty from World War I, a merchant seaman who was originally buried in the Marsala British Cemetery. In addition, three special memorials commemorate men known to have been originally buried in other cemeteries in the region, but whose graves could not be found on concentration.

References

External links
 
 

Commonwealth War Graves Commission cemeteries in Italy
Commonwealth War Graves Commission Cemetery
1943 establishments in Italy
Buildings and structures in Sicily
Tourist attractions in Sicily
Cemeteries in Syracuse